MV Plancius, formerly HNLMS Tydeman (A906), is a renovated oceanographic research vessel of the Royal Netherlands Navy now employed as a polar expedition cruise vessel by owner and operator Oceanwide Expeditions. She was commissioned into the Royal Netherlands Navy on 10 November 1976, and served until 2004, before being renovated for commercial use. The vessel was used for both military and civilian research and had a fracture zone named after it.

Design and description
The ship is powered by a diesel-electric system composed of three Stork-Werkspoor 8-FCHD-240 diesel engines and one motor turning one shaft creating . Any two of the three diesel engines power the propulsion while the third engine powers the ship. The vessel also mounts a Paxman diesel engine creating , an active rudder creating  and two bow thrusters creating .

Tydeman was designed for military and civilian research and had a maximum complement of 62 including 8 officers with an additional 15 civilians. The vessel had six laboratories and mounted a flight deck and hangar large enough to operate small helicopters. In naval service, the ship had a forward working deck with a wet hall and midships and aft working decks, along with diving facilities and two container spaces for  standard shipping containers. The vessel was equipped with Atlas DESO-10 echo sounders, EDO-Western type 515 deep sea echo sounder, ELAC-Mittellodar wreckage sonar, Geometrics G-801 magnetometer, bottom diggers, radiosondes, barometers and Kelvin Hughes, hull-mounted side-scan sonar. The vessel mounted one 10-ton crane and one 4-ton crane with frames.

Construction and career

Dutch service
Ordered in October 1974, the vessel was constructed for the Royal Netherlands Navy by BV de Merwede at their yard in Hardinxveld-Giessendam, Netherlands, and the keel was laid down on 29 April 1975 with the yard number 612. The vessel was launched on 18 December 1975 and commissioned on 10 November 1976. The vessel was named after Vice Admiral Gustaaf Frederik Tydeman, a hydrographer of the Siboga Expedition (1899–1900) in the Dutch East Indies. Used for civilian and military research, the vessel became the namesake of the Tydeman fracture zone (36°N 23°W), between Madeira and the Azores which was part of the project investigating the area in 1977. 

From March 1991 to March 1992, Tydeman trialled a derivative version of the Thomson-Sintra DUBM 41 towed sonar system. This was followed by a major refit from April to November 1992 at the aan der Giessen-Noord shipyard. From 1996 to 1997, the research ship trialled the TSM 2670 2-ton active low-frequency sonar body and passive towed sonar array. The ship was taken out of service in June 2004.

Post naval career
After retiring from naval service, the vessel was acquired by Oceanwide Expeditions and in 2009, the ship was converted to a passenger/cruise ship. The vessel was ice-strengthened, rated at 1D and accommodates 108 passengers. The vessel carries 10 zodiacs and a crew of 37. Tydeman was renamed Plancius and sails under the Dutch flag, used for cruises to the Arctic and Antarctica.

Notes

Citations

References

External links
 
 Castles of the Sea
 Oceanwide Expeditions

Auxiliary ships of the Netherlands
Survey vessels of the Royal Netherlands Navy
1975 ships
Ships built in the Netherlands